Course of Empire is the debut self-titled album from the industrial/alternative rock band of the same name. The album was originally released on Dallas based Carpe Diem Records and sold over 5000 copies in the city alone. All songs were written by Course of Empire and produced by David Castell (Blue October, Burden Brothers, Deep Blue Something, SouthFM). The following August, Zoo Entertainment signed the band and reissued their CD with distribution through BMG

Track listing 
"Ptah" – 4:17
"Coming Of The Century" – 4:04
"God's Jig" – 4:02
"Copious" – 3:34
"Cradle Calls" – 4:32
"Under The Skies" – 4:10
"Peace Child" – 5:43
"Sins Of The Fathers" – 3:25
"Thrust" – 7:21
"Mountains Of The Spoken" – 3:42
"Dawn Of The Great Eastern Sun" – 6:37

Zoo Reissue 
Zoo Entertainment remixed and remastered the album in January 1992, which resulted in significantly different track lengths.
"Ptah" – 3:14
"Coming Of The Century" – 4:04
"God's Jig" – 4:02
"Copious" – 3:31
"Cradle Calls" – 4:03
"Under The Skies" – 4:08
"Peace Child" – 4:46
"Sins Of The Fathers" – 3:26
"Thrust" – 7:30
"Mountains Of The Spoken" – 3:41
"Dawn Of The Great Eastern Sun" – 6:39

Zoo Entertainment (record label) albums
1990 albums
Albums produced by David Castell